The Roman Catholic Diocese of Lancaster is a Latin Church Roman Catholic diocese centred on Lancaster Cathedral in the city of Lancaster in Lancashire, England.

History

The diocese was erected in 1924, taking areas and parishes from the Archdiocese of Liverpool and the Diocese of Hexham and Newcastle. Emeritus bishop Patrick O'Donoghue retired on 1 May 2009, and emeritus bishop Michael Gregory Campbell OSA retired on 9 April 2018. , the ordinary is Paul Swarbrick.

Details
It is in the province of Liverpool. It extends along the west of England from the Ribble River in the south of Preston to the Scottish border, comprising the counties of Cumbria and much of Lancashire. The diocese has around 90 active priests, 50 permanent deacons, 12 secondary schools, over a hundred primary schools and a similar number of parishes.

Central organisations of the diocese include the residential youth centre Castlerigg Manor, the Diocesan Youth Service, the Education Centre, Catholic Caring Services and others including the monthly diocesan newspaper, The Voice. There are also many other committees, societies and other informal organisations in the diocese.

Area and population
In 2004 the Catholic population of the diocese was 111,264 for a total of 1,050,000 inhabitants (10.6%).

Areas in the diocese include the city of Preston; a city with an uncharacteristically high Catholic population - the highest anywhere in England & Wales in fact, due in no small part to the fact that the Protestant Reformation never took hold in Preston to the same extent as it did in other places. Also notable in the diocese are: the Lake District, Sellafield nuclear power station, and towns and cities including Carlisle, Lancaster, Blackpool, Whitehaven, Workington, Barrow-in-Furness, the major shipbuilding town.

Bishops

Since the erection of the Diocese in 1924, there have been seven bishops of this diocese. The longest-serving was the third (Brian Charles Foley), who served from 1962 until 1985. The most recent to retire is Michael Gregory Campbell. Campbell was installed on 1 May 2009 following the retirement of Patrick O'Donoghue. On 12 February 2018 it was announced that Pope Francis had appointed Canon Paul Swarbrick, parish priest of Christ the Good Shepherd, Workington, to be the seventh bishop of the diocese. On 9 April 2018, Paul Swarbrick was consecrated and installed as Bishop of Lancaster at St Peter's Cathedral; Vincent Cardinal Nichols attended the ordination.

The above-mentioned main article lists the ordinaries (bishops of the diocese).

Coadjutor Bishops
John (Jack) Brewer (1983-1985)
Michael Gregory Campbell, O.S.A. (2008-2009)

Auxiliary Bishop
Thomas Bernard Pearson (1949-1983); do not confuse with Thomas Wulstan Pearson, O.S.B., the first bishop of this diocese.

Other priests of this diocese who became bishops
Patrick Altham Kelly, appointed Bishop of Salford in 1984
Brian Michael Noble, appointed Bishop of Shrewsbury in 1995

St Peter's Cathedral

The Cathedral Church of St Peter on Balmoral Road, Lancaster, is the diocesan cathedral and the seat of the Bishop of Lancaster. Completed in 1859 as a parish Church of the Archdiocese of Liverpool, and raised to the status of a cathedral upon the establishment of the diocese in 1924, it is also a functioning parish. In addition, its grounds host numerous diocesan offices, including the Bishop's Office, Finance Office and the Diocesan Youth Service.

Gallery

References

External links
Official Site
Castlerigg Manor - Diocesan youth retreat centre.
Diocesan Youth Service
Lancaster RC Cathedral
Diocesan Retreat Centre
The Latin Mass Society in the RC Diocese of Lancaster 
GCatholic.org
St Mary's Roman Catholic Church and Grotto

 
Christianity in Lancashire
Christian organizations established in 1924
Roman Catholic dioceses and prelatures established in the 20th century
Roman Catholic Ecclesiastical Province of Liverpool